The Scipionic Circle, or the Circle of Scipio, was a group of philosophers, poets, and politicians patronized by their namesake, Scipio Aemilianus. Together they would discuss Greek culture, literature, and humanism. Alongside their philhellenic disposition, the group also had a more humane Roman foreign policy. The term was first derived during the 19th century and ubiquitously adopted by scholars of the early 20th century. The collection of members varied during its existence, from 15 names of the early period, to 27 in its middle to 10 in its final.

Contemporary academia regards  the concept of the "Scipionic Circle" with suspicion. Cicero is the primary source on the subject in his works De amicitia and De republica. Cicero's construction bestows an unsupported unity between Scipio's friends. If there ever was such a unity it would be between Panaetius and the more philosophically-inclined members of the collective. In addition to a dependence on these works of Cicero, within these two works Cicero creates two different circles. Among other problems brought up by academics, two of the most prominent members of the group, Terence and Panaetius, could not have met as Terence had died prior to Panaetius arriving in Rome.

In De re publica
Main speakers:
 Scipio Aemilianus, consul of Rome in 147 BC and 134 BC.
Gaius Laelius Sapiens, consul of Rome in 140 BC.

Senior speakers:
Lucius Furius Philus, consul of Rome in 136 BC. 
Manius Manilius, consul of Rome in 149 BC.
Spurius Mummius, satirist and soldier.

Younger speakers:
Quintus Aelius Tubero, tribunate in 130 BC.
Publius Rutilius Rufus, consul of Rome in 105 BC; fought alongside Scipio during the Numantine War.
Quintus Mucius Scaevola Augur, consul of Rome in 117 BC. 
Gaius Fannius, consul of Rome in 122 BC.

Having younger speakers illustrates "the Roman penchant for training the youth by having them listen to respected members of the previlous generation, as in De oratore".

In De oratore
This dialogue takes place in 129 BC, "in the aftermath of the turbulent reform politics of Tiberius Gracchus and shortly before Scipio's untimely and mysterious death."

Senior Speakers:
Quintus Mucius Scaevola Augur, who "provides an important link between the two dialogues, a young man in De re publica and an old man, the father-in-law and teacher of Crassus, in De oratore."

Other members
Terence, Carthaginian-born playwright. 
Gaius Lucilius, the earliest Roman satirist.
Polybius, a Greek historian.
Panaetius of Rhodes, the seventh and final Stoic scholarch.

References

Political thought in ancient Rome
Ancient Roman philosophers